Saudades may refer to:

 Saudades (Trio Beyond album), 2006
 Saudades (Nana Vasconcelos album), 1979
 Saudades, Santa Catarina, Brazil